Lake Cheko is a small freshwater lake in Siberia, near the Podkamennaya Tunguska River, in what is now the Evenkiysky District of the Krasnoyarsk Krai.

Dimensions and environs

Lake Cheko is a small bowl-shaped lake.

In the lake flows the Kimchu River (Russian: кимчу), which flows into the Chunya River (Russian: Чуня), which in turn flows into the Podkamennaya Tunguska.

Possible relation to the Tunguska event
The lake is inside the blast zone, and in the probable direction of whatever caused the Tunguska event.

It has been connected by some scientists to the Tunguska event and they postulate the lake was created by a chunk of the exploding meteorite that struck the ground. In 2017, that theory was disputed by Russian scientists by proving that the lake is older, possibly even much older, than the Tunguska Event.

Age of the lake
It is suggested that the lake, which lies approximately 8 kilometres north-north-west of the event hypocenter, was formed by a fragment which struck the ground. More recent evidence suggests at least a portion of the lake is over twice as old as the date of the meteorite.

Other varied evidence
A 1961 investigation estimated the age of the lake to be at least 5000 years, based on meters-thick silt deposits on the lake bed. However, a 2001 paper concluded that the sediments, isotopes, and pollen "suggest that Lake Cheko formed at the time of the Tunguska Event." Their recent research indicates that only a metre or so of the sediment layer on the lake bed is "normal lacustrine sedimentation", indicating a much younger lake of about 100 years.

Acoustic-echo soundings of the lake floor offer some further support for the impact hypothesis, revealing a conical shape for the lake bed, which could be consistent with an impact crater. Also, the lake's long axis points to the hypocenter of the Tunguska explosion, about 7.0 km away. Magnetic readings also indicate a possible meter-sized chunk of rock below the lake's deepest point, which may be a fragment of the colliding body.

In 2008, a BBC News story on the 100th anniversary of the Tunguska Event mentioned that researchers at Imperial College London had pointed out that many of the trees surrounding the lake are older than 100 years, which suggests that the lake could not have been created by an impact in 1908.  The researchers also pointed out other problems, including the morphology of the lake and the surrounding terrain, the lack of impactor debris and ejecta, noting that the characteristics of the impactor required by the impact theory are inconsistent with existing models of the known features of the event.

However, researchers from the University of Bologna investigated the lake bed in 2009 and, based on evidence such as sedimentation, reaffirmed the conclusions of the 2001 paper, that Lake Cheko formed at the time of the Tunguska Event. 

Additional research by Russian scientists in 2017 appeared to contradict a purely Tunguska Event-based formation theory. Core samples of sediment taken from the deepest part of the lake demonstrated an age of up to 280 years, suggesting that at least a portion of the lake existed prior to the meteorite striking.

See also
 List of possible impact structures on Earth

References

External links
 geotimes.org site with 3D reconstruction of Lake Cheko
 Morphobathymetric map of the Lake Cheko

Cheko
Possible impact craters on Earth